The 2012 ICC European Twenty20 Championship Division Two is a cricket tournament that took place between 3–8 September 2012. It forms part of the European Cricket Championship. Greece hosted the event.

Teams
Teams that qualified are as follows:

Group A

Group B

Squads

Fixtures

Group stage

Group A

Group B

Play-offs

Semi-final

Semi-final

9th-place play-off semi-final

9th-place play-off semi-final

5th-place play-off semi-final

5th-place play-off semi-final

11th-place play-off

9th-place play-off

7th-place play-off

5th-place play-off

3rd-place play-off

Final

Statistics

Most Runs
The top five run scorers (total runs) are included in this table.

Most Wickets
The top five wicket takers (total wickets) are listed in this table.

Final Placings

After the conclusion of the tournament the teams were distributed as follows:

See also

2012 ICC World Twenty20 Qualifier
European Cricket Championship

References

2014 ICC World Twenty20
International cricket competitions in 2012
European Cricket Championship
2012 in Greek sport
International cricket competitions in Greece